Diede de Groot defeated the defending champion Yui Kamiji in the final, 6–4, 6–3 to win the women's singles wheelchair tennis title at the 2021 French Open. It was the second step in an eventual Super Slam for de Groot, and she completed the double career Grand Slam with the win.

Seeds

Draw

Finals

References

External Links
 Draw

Wheelchair Women's Singles
French Open, 2021 Women's Singles